Topolinsky Leskhoz is a rural locality (a settlement) in Topolinsky Selsoviet, Uglovsky District, Altai Krai, Russia. The population was 196 as of 2013. There is 1 street.

Geography 
Topolinsky Leskhoz is located 72 km south of Uglovskoye (the district's administrative centre) by road. Topolnoye is the nearest rural locality.

References 

Rural localities in Uglovsky District, Altai Krai